Sarabadan (also Romanized as Sarābādān; also known as Sarboodoon) is a village in Kharrazan Rural District, in the Central District of Tafresh County, Markazi Province, Iran. At the 2006 census, its population was 54, in 29 families.

References 

Populated places in Tafresh County